Hnatyuk or Hnatiuk is a gender-neutral Ukrainian surname. It may refer to:

 Dmytro Hnatyuk or Hnatiuk (1925–2016), Ukrainian opera singer and politician
 Glen Hnatiuk (born 1965), Canadian golfer
 Halyna Hnatyuk or Hnatiuk (1927–2016), Ukrainian linguist
 Jim Hnatiuk (1950–2018), Canadian politician
 Mykola Hnatyuk or Hnatiuk (born 1952), Ukrainian singer
 Roger Hnatiuk (born 1946), Canadian-Australian botanist
 Volodymyr Hnatiuk (1871–1926), Ukrainian writer

See also
 
 
 Hnatiuk

Ukrainian-language surnames